Gillian Berrie is a Scottish filmmaker and co-founder of the Glasgow-based production company Sigma Films with director David Mackenzie.

Berrie also founded Film City Glasgow, the state-of-the-art creative cluster for production, picture and sound which spearheads independent production in Scotland.

She also created the hugely successful Jumpcut project which was dedicated to giving young and underprivileged people access to working in the film industry through a pop-up film school that created an intensive, mentor-lead fast track into the industry. The project went on to inspire Berrie to create Short Circuit, the Scottish talent initiative and shorts funding scheme that launched in 2020.

Career 
In 1996 Berrie co-founded Sigma Films with director David Mackenzie, writing and producing serial award-winning shorts, California Sunshine and Somersault.

Alongside, Berrie gained experience in numerous film and television roles as well as Casting Director on Ken Loach’s My Name is Joe (for which Peter Mullan won the Palme D’or in Cannes) and Lynne Ramsay’s legendary Ratcatcher.

Casting experience on the aforementioned led Berrie to create the charity, Starfish which then became Jumpcut, which ultimately morphed into Short Circuit, and Big Fish Casting which segued into Kahleen Crawford Casting.

Gillian produced many of David Mackenzie’s films including: Last Great Wilderness, Hallam Foe, Young Adam, You Instead (aka Tonight You're Mine), Perfect Sense, Starred Up and the biggest film ever to be made entirely in Scotland, Outlaw King.  She was also heavily involved in the post-production, festival, UK/US theatrical release and Oscar campaign for Academy Award Nominee Hell or High Water. 

At the Scottish BAFTA New Talent Awards in 2002 Gillian won the BAFTA for Outstanding Achievement.

In order to create a vibrant hub for the film community in Scotland, Gillian founded the state of the art, Film City Glasgow in 2004. Since then it has been a full house of productions and film-makers.

In 2012 she founded Jumpcut, the UK's one and only, intensive, mentor-led Summer School to provide a fast-track for youngsters into working in the film industry. This project was a runaway success. It ran for three years and won several awards.

She also co-produced the multi-prize winner Dear Frankie and Jonathan’s Glazer’s Under the Skin (which won 23 awards and received 110 nominations).

Berrie has produced several features for first time feature film directors, including David Mackenzie, Colin Kennedy, Andrea Arnold, Morag MacKinnon and Ciaran Foy, as well as numerous additional shorts including the lauded I Love Luci.

Over the years, Berrie co-produced with Denmark’s Zentropa many times, including Wilbur (Wants to kill himself), Dogville, Manderlay, Brothers, Dear Wendy, Donkeys and After the Wedding. Her most successful collaboration was Advance Party a fast-track-first-time-director project which included Andrea Arnold’s Red Road which won 6 BAFTAs, 2 BIFAs, the Cannes Prix de Jury, and many other awards.

In 2012 Berrie won ‘Tastemaker of the Year’ at the Scottish Style Awards. Previous winners are James McAvoy, Vivienne Westwood and KT Tunstall.

In 2014 Berrie received an Honorary Doctorate from the University of West of Scotland for her contribution to film, culture and the arts.

From 2014 to 2018 Gillian devoted several years to strategic and intensive lobbying for additional funding and support for the screen sector in Scotland which resulted in the government doubling its investment and the creation of the enormously successful Screen Scotland.

Gillian continues to contribute to the next generation of Scottish film-makers through Short Circuit, which is in its 3rd year and has so far given the first opportunities in film-making to hundreds of new-comers and produced dozens of short films and is developing a number of feature films.

Short Circuit is Scotland's hub for filmmaking talent, supporting the creative and professional development of new and emerging writers, directors, and producers. 

Over three years, Short Circuit’s film commissioning strand ‘Sharp Shorts’ will award over £400,000 in funding across 27 filmmaking teams, creating opportunities for Scotland’s most exciting emerging new screen talent. 

‘Sharp Shorts’ has become one of Scotland’s most diverse creative initiatives, with an overwhelming majority of female filmmakers as well as significant representation across the LGBTQ+, non-white and disabled communities.

The first batch of short films are screening internationally at festivals such as SXSW, BFI Flare, EIFF, Dinard, LSFF, Berlin, with multiple awards. In particular, Sean Lionadh’s short Too Rough has won 11 awards to date. 

The ‘First Features’ strand, with a fund of over £300,000, will support 30 new writers, directors, and producers, enabling Scotland-based filmmakers to take a career-defining step towards making their debut feature.  

(First Features supported projects to date: 20, with 5 currently being contracted. We intend to fund an additional 5 projects by Mar 2023). 

A broad range of further training and events, including ‘Producer Accelerator’ and ‘Convergence’, will engage with nearly 3,000 filmmakers across Scotland.

Most recently, Berrie exec-produced the critically acclaimed Pilot and 2nd episode of the Disney/ FX series Under the Banner of Heaven for which Andrew Garfield was nominated for an Emmy (2022). 

She also produced Taron Egerton's forthcoming feature, Tetris for Apple, release Q1, 2023.

Berrie has just completed her first short, Hunger, as writer and director.

Filmography

Awards

Academy Awards

BAFTA Awards

BAFTA Scotland Awards

Berlin International Film Festival

British Independent Film Awards

Cannes Film Festival

References

Scottish film producers
Scottish film directors
Scottish screenwriters
Year of birth missing (living people)
Living people